Benito Orgiana (10 February 1938 – 2 April 2021) was an Italian politician.

Born in Orroli on 10 February 1938, Orgiana served on local legislative bodies including the Cagliari municipal council until his 1992 election to the Chamber of Deputies. He served until 1994, as a member of the Italian Republican Party. He was a cofounder of the Fortza Paris party, formed in 2001, and served as president of

References

1938 births
2021 deaths
Italian Republican Party politicians
Deputies of Legislature XI of Italy